= Otto Anninger =

Industrialist and art collector (1874–1954)

Otto Anninger (20 February 1874 – 5 July 1954, Lucerne) was a major industrialist and an art collector.

== Life ==
Anniger married Clara (née Wolf), (born 12 January 1886, Vienna; died 23 September 1938, Paris) They lived in the "Villa Anninger" located at Vienna XIX, Lannerstraße 36. The Anningers also had a villa in Vienna XIX, Billrothstraße 46.

Anniger had a company "W. Abeles & Co.", agency and commission trade in Vienna I., located at Schottenbastei 4, as well as factories in Teesdorf, Lower Austria, and Dugaresa, Yugoslavia. He was a shareholder of Baumwoll-Import und Handels-A.G. in Bratislava, shareholder of the spinning and weaving mill Teesdorf-Schönau in Vienna.

== Art collection ==
Anninger collected paintings and reliefs by, among others, Robert and Franz von Alt, Canaletto and Erwin Pendl.

== Nazi persecution ==
When Austria merged with Nazi Germany in the Anschluss of 1938, the Anningers fled to Paris. His wife committed suicide. Anninger then fled to the U.S.

In 1938, Anniger's company "W. Abeles & Co." was Aryanized (transferred to a non-Jewish owner) by the Austrian Kontrollbank, All his properties were confiscated.;

According to the Louvre Museum in Paris, Anniger donated a painting by Jan de Heem in 1939.
